Senator Rutherford may refer to:

Dan Rutherford (born 1955), Illinois State Senate
Griffith Rutherford (1721–1805), North Carolina State Senate
J. T. Rutherford (1921–2006), Texas State Senate
Samuel Rutherford (Georgia politician) (1870–1932), Georgia State Senate
John Rutherfurd (1760–1840),  U.S. Senator from New Jersey